Project Safe Childhood (PSC) is a Department of Justice initiative launched in 2006 that aims to combat the proliferation of technology-facilitated sexual exploitation crimes against children.  PSC coordinates efforts by various federal, state and local agencies and organizations to protect children by investigating and prosecuting online sexual predators.

PSC partners include Internet Crimes Against Children (ICAC) task forces, the FBI, U.S. Postal Inspection Service, Immigration and Customs Enforcement, the U.S. Marshals Service, the National Center for Missing & Exploited Children, and state and local law enforcement officials in each U.S. Attorney's district.

Prominent arrests under Project Safe Childhood
James Gordon Meek, ABC News producer accused of raping and otherwise abusing children
Josh Duggar, 2021

References

External links

United States Department of Justice agencies
Government agencies established in 2006
2006 establishments in the United States
Child sexual abuse in the United States
Computer security organizations